Gladstone station is a SEPTA Regional Rail station which is located in Lansdowne, Pennsylvania. Situated at Walsh and Madison Roads, it serves the Media/Wawa Line.

History and architectural features
In 2013, this station saw 208 boardings and 275 alightings on an average weekday. 

The station includes a 108-space parking lot; additional parking may be found on the opposite side of the tracks off Scottdale Road, which itself runs along Darby Creek, both of which are under a train trestle west of the station.

Prior to being named Gladstone, this station was known as Burmont; before that, it was known as Kellyville.

Station layout
Gladstone has two low-level side platforms with a connecting pathway across the tracks.

References

External links
SEPTA – Gladstone Station
 Station from Google Maps Street View

SEPTA Regional Rail stations
Stations on the West Chester Line